Sem Dirks (born 14 March 2001) is a Dutch professional footballer who plays as a left-back for Eerste Divisie club VVV-Venlo.

Club career
Dirks made his professional debut with Jong AZ in a 6–1 Eerste Divisie loss to NAC Breda on 29 August 2020.

On 31 January 2022, Dirks was loaned to VVV-Venlo. On 19 May, the deal was made permanent and he signed a two-year deal with an option for an additional year.

Career statistics

References

External links
 

2001 births
Living people
Dutch footballers
Association football fullbacks
Jong AZ players
VVV-Venlo players
Eerste Divisie players
Sportspeople from Beverwijk
Footballers from North Holland